The Catholic diocese of Sufetula was an ancient bishopric in the city of Sufetula, on the site of modern Tunisian Sbeitla, in the Roman province of Byzacena.

Background
 Sufetula, also known as Speitla, Sbeitla and Sufetula, is an archaeological site in Tunisia with well preserved ruins from the Roman Empire. Roman era Sufetula was a civitas (town) and border post on the limes Africana in the Roman province of Africa during the Roman Empire.
The town was flourishing by 79AD and lasted to 647  when the town was sacked by  Arab, Berber raiders.

Ancient Bishopric
Sufetula was also the seat of an ancient Christian bishopric. The bishopric was founded during the Roman Empire and survived through the Arian Vandal Kingdom and Orthodox Byzantine Empire, only ceasing to function with the Muslim conquest of the Maghreb.

Ancient churches

Ruins of Sufetula show that the town had at least six churches.
The church of Bellator
The chapel of Jucundus
The Basilica of Vitalis
The church of Servus
The Basilica of Saints Gervasius, Protasius and Tryphon
sixth century Basilica
The chapel of Bishop Honorius, outside the city.
Byzantine Chapel, largely unexcavated

Among these several appear to have been cathedra. The so-called Church of Servus is believed to have been the Donatist cathedral of Sufetula, while the church of Bellator, was the Catholic and latter Orthodox cathedral. The Basilica of Vitalis may have been the Arian Cathedral and dates from the 5th century. The remains at Sufetula are important as they indicate that the various sects within Christianity built and kept their own places of worship, not being taken over by successive regimes.

Known bishops
Privatianus fl.256
Jucundus (Catholic) fl.411-419
Titianus (Donatist fl.411
Amicacius (Catholic) early 5th century
Bellator (Catholic) early 5th century, built church that bears his name and associate of Jucundus.
Paesidius (Arian) before 484, was sent into exile by king Huneric before the general purge of bishops
Honorius (6th century) associated with the siege of Sufetula

Titular see
The diocese was nominally revived, at least in name, as a titular see of the lowest (episcopal) rank in 1914.
It has had the following incumbents, mostly missionary members of congregations :
 João Irineu Joffily (1914.08.18 – 1916.05.04), later Archbishop
 Flaminio Belotti (包海容), Pontifical Institute for Foreign Missions (P.I.M.E.) (1917.06.14 – 1945.11.23)
 Louis Joseph Cabana, White Fathers (M. Afr.) (1947.01.09 – 1953.03.25) (later Archbishop)
 Joseph-Marie-Eugène Bretault, M. Afr. (1954.06.27 – 1955.09.14)
 Arnold Boghaert, Redemptorists (C.SS.R.) (1956.11.09 – 1957.06.04)
 Camille Vandekerckhove, Lazarists (C.M.) (1957.12.24 – 1959.11.10)
 Thomas Patrick Collins, Maryknoll Fathers (M.M.) (1960.11.15 – 1973.12.07)

Source and external links
 GigaCatholic, with incumbent biography links

References 

Catholic titular sees in Africa
Roman sites in Tunisia